Danna or Dana is a small village on a hilltop in Oghi Tehsil, in Mansehra District of Pakistan's Khyber Pakhtunkhwa province. This village is the mainhold of the endangered Mankiyali language.

References

Villages in Khyber Pakhtunkhwa
Populated places in Mansehra District